The  geostationary satellites, operated by the Japan Meteorological Agency (JMA), support weather forecasting, tropical cyclone tracking, and meteorology research. Most meteorological agencies in East Asia, Southeast Asia, Australia and New Zealand use the satellites for their own weather monitoring and forecasting operations.

Originally also named Geostationary Meteorological Satellites (GMS), since the launch of GMS-1 (Himawari 1) in 1977, there have been three generations, including GMS, MTSAT, and Himawari 8/9. Himawari 8/9 satellites are currently available for operational use.

Status

See also

 Japan Meteorological Agency (JMA)

References

External links
 Satellite Imagery from the Japan Meteorological Agency
 Meteorological Satellite Center of JMA